Gladiolus murielae is a species of flowering plant in the family Iridaceae, native to eastern Africa, from Ethiopia to Malawi. It has been given a number of English names, including Abyssinian gladiolus and fragrant gladiolus. It was formerly placed in the genus Acidanthera.

Widely cultivated, it is a common subject in western and southern European gardens, where the corms are lifted every year and stored in frost-free conditions.

This plant has gained the Royal Horticultural Society's Award of Garden Merit.

Hardiness: Zones 7–10 (6b with deep planting and mulching)

Taxonomy
The species was first described as Acidanthera bicolor by Christian Hochstetter in 1844. In 1973, Wessel Marais included the genus Acidanthera in Gladiolus. As the name Gladiolus bicolor had already been published by John Gilbert Baker in 1877 for a different species of Gladiolus, Marais needed another name. He chose to call the species Gladiolus callianthus. Marais was apparently unaware that James Kelway had already published the name Gladiolus murielae in 1932, so that the name "G. callianthus" was superfluous. The epithet murielae honours Muriel Erskine; her husband had collected in Ethiopia the specimen on which Kelway based the name.

The species is often still offered for sale under the name Acidanthera bicolor, sometimes with murielae added as an infraspecific name, or even as the cultivar name 'Murielae'.

References

murielae
Flora of Ethiopia
Plants described in 1844